The Spring Baronetcy, of Pakenham in the County of Suffolk, is a title in the Baronetage of England.

History
The title was created on 11 August 1641 for Sir William Spring, a Suffolk Member of Parliament who had already been knighted by Charles I. He was the son of Sir William Spring of Pakenham, and descended from the Suffolk gentry Spring family, who had been major wool merchants in the late fifteenth and sixteenth centuries.

The baronetcy was created as part of an attempt by the king to win the favour of Parliamentarian gentry families in the lead-up to the Civil War, as the Spring family was staunchly Parliamentarian and held considerable influence in Suffolk. Following the Restoration of the monarchy in 1660, the family was issued a general pardon for their actions against the king. The first baronet's son, also William, inherited the title. He was an MP for Suffolk and one of the earliest members to be designated a Whig. The baronetcy became dormant on the death of the sixth Baronet in 1769.

Motto
The family motto is Non mihi sed Patriae (Latin), Not for myself but for my country.

Spring baronets, of Pakenham (1641)
Sir William Spring, 1st Baronet (1613–1654)
Sir William Spring, 2nd Baronet (1642–1684)
Sir Thomas Spring, 3rd Baronet (1672–1704)
Sir William Spring, 4th Baronet (1697–1737)
Sir John Spring, 5th Baronet (1674–1740)
Sir John Spring, 6th Baronet (died 1769)

See also
List of political families in the United Kingdom
Spring family

External links

Pakenham – Village of Two Mills (History section)

Further reading
Medieval Clothing and Textiles, by Robin Netherton and Gale R. Owen-Crocker
The Springs of Lavenham and the Suffolk Cloth Trade in the XV and XVI Centuries, by Barbara McClenaghan

References

Baronetcies in the Baronetage of England
 *
People from Babergh District
1641 establishments in England